Bixin is an apocarotenoid found in the seeds of the achiote tree (Bixa orellana) from which it derives its name. It is commonly extracted from the seeds to form annatto, a natural food coloring, containing about 5% pigments of which 70-80% are bixin.

Applications

Several thousand tons are harvested annually.

Chemical properties
Bixin is unstable. It isomerizes into trans-bixin (β-bixin), the double-bond isomer.

Bixin is soluble in fats and alcohols but insoluble in water. Upon exposure to alkali, the methyl ester is hydrolyzed to produce the dicarboxylic acid norbixin, a water-soluble derivative.

References

Apocarotenoids
E-number additives